The 1995 All-SEC football team consists of American football players selected to the All-Southeastern Conference (SEC) chosen by various selectors for the 1995 NCAA Division I-A football season. The selectors for the 1995 season included the Associated Press (AP) and the conference coaches (Coaches).

Three teams dominated the All-SEC selections with more than five honorees, as follows:
 Conference champion Florida was ranked No. 2 in the final AP Poll and placed 11 players among the first- or second-team All-SEC teams. Six Florida players were selected as first-team players by both the AP and Coaches: wide receiver Chris Doering, offensive linemen Reggie Green and Jason Odom, defensive end Mark Campbell, linebacker Ben Hanks, and defensive back Lawrence Wright.  Quarterback Danny Wuerffel was selected as a first-team player by the AP and was voted SEC Player of the Year.
 Tennessee was ranked No. 3 in the final AP Poll and placed 10 players among the first- and second-team selections.  Tennessee's honorees included quarterback Peyton Manning (Coaches-1) and wide receiver Joey Kent (AP-1).
 Arkansas won the SEC Western Division and placed six players among the first- and second-team honorees.  The Arkansas honorees included running back Madre Hill (AP-1, Coaches-1) and linebacker Mark Smith (AP-1, Coaches-1).

Offensive selections

Quarterbacks
Danny Wuerffel, Florida (AP-1, Coaches-2)
Peyton Manning, Tennessee (AP-2, Coaches-1)

Running backs
Moe Williams, Kentucky (AP-1, Coaches-1)
Madre Hill, Arkansas (AP-1, Coaches-1)

Wide receivers
Chris Doering*, Florida (AP-1, Coaches-1)
Eric Moulds, Miss. St. (AP-2, Coaches-1)
 Joey Kent, Tennessee (AP-1)
Ike Hilliard, Florida (AP-2, Coaches-2)
Eddie Kennison, LSU (Coaches-2)
Sheddrick Wilson, LSU (Coaches-2)

Centers
Shannon Roubique, Auburn (AP-1, Coaches-2)
Jeff Smith, Tennessee (AP-2, Coaches-1)

Guards
Reggie Green, Florida (AP-1, Coaches-1)
Bubba Miller, Tennessee (AP-1, Coaches-2)
Donnie Young, Florida (AP-2, Coaches-2)
Verl Mitchell, Arkansas (AP-2, Coaches-2)
Paul Taylor, Georgia (AP-2)

Tackles
Jason Odom*, Florida (AP-1, Coaches-1)
Jason Layman, Tennessee (AP-1, Coaches-1)
Willie Anderson, Auburn (AP-2, Coaches-1)
Troy Stark, Georgia (AP-2, Coaches-2)
James Dexter, South Carolina (AP-2)

Tight ends
 Kris Mangum, Ole Miss (AP-1, Coaches-2)
Andy Fuller, Auburn (AP-2, Coaches-1)

Defensive selections

Ends
Mark Campbell, Florida (AP-1, Coaches-1)
Gabe Northern, LSU (AP-1, Coaches-1 [as LB])
Leonard Little, Tennessee (AP-2)
Steve Conley, Arkansas (AP-2, Coaches-1)

Tackles
Shannon Brown, Alabama (AP-1, Coaches-1)
James Manley, Vanderbilt (AP-1, Coaches-2)
Shane Burton, Tennessee (AP-2, Coaches-2)
Chuck Wiley, LSU (AP-2)
Eric Sullivan, South Carolina (AP-2)

Middle guards
Junior Soli, Arkansas (AP-2, Coaches-2)

Linebackers
Mark Smith, Arkansas (AP-1, Coaches-1)
Ben Hanks, Florida (AP-1, Coaches-1)
Marcellus Mostella, Auburn (AP-1, Coaches-2)
Dexter Daniels, Florida (AP-2, Coaches-1)
Dwayne Curry, Miss. St. (AP-2, Coaches-2)
John Walters, Alabama (AP-2, Coaches-2)
Whit Marshall, Georgia (AP-2)
Scott Galyon, Tennessee (AP-2)
Phillip Daniels, Georgia (Coaches-2)

Defensive backs
Lawrence Wright, Florida (AP-1, Coaches-1)
Walt Harris, Miss. St. (AP-1, Coaches-1)
DeRon Jenkins, Tennessee (AP-1, Coaches-1)
Anthone Lott, Florida (AP-2, Coaches-1)
Kevin Jackson, Alabama (AP-1)
Reggie Rusk, Kentucky (AP-2, Coaches-2)
Deshea Townsend, Alabama (AP-2)
Corey Johnson, Georgia (Coaches-2)
Ben Washington, South Carolina (Coaches-2)
Tracy Cantlope, Arkansas (Coaches-2)

Special teams

Kickers
Jeff Hall, Tennessee  (AP-2, Coaches-1)
Matt Hawkins, Auburn (AP-1)
Michael Proctor, Alabama (Coaches-2)

Punters
Chad Kessler, LSU (AP-1, Coaches-1)
Bill Marinangel, Vanderbilt (AP-2, Coaches-2)

Key

Bold = Consensus first-team selection by both the coaches and AP

AP = Associated Press

Coaches = Selected by the SEC coaches

* = unanimous selection by AP

See also
1995 College Football All-America Team

References

All-Southeastern Conference
All-SEC football teams